Yergera  is a village in the southern state of Karnataka, India. It is located in the Raichur taluk of Raichur district in Karnataka.

Demographics
 India census, Yergera had a population of 5054 with 2584 males and 2470 females.

See also
 Raichur
 Districts of Karnataka

References

External links
 http://Raichur.nic.in/

Villages in Raichur district